The following is a list of villages in Lviv Oblast in Ukraine.

Brody Raion (Бродівський район)

Busk Raion (Буський район)

Drohobych Raion (Дрогобицький район)

Horodok Raion (Городоцький район)

Kamianka-Buzka Raion (Кам'янка-Бузький район)

Mostyska Raion (Мостиський район)

Mykolaiv Raion (Миколаївський район)

Peremyshliany Raion (Перемишлянський район)

Pustomyty Raion (Пустомитівський район)

Radekhiv Raion (Радехівський район)

Sambir Raion (Самбірський район)

Skole Raion (Сколівський район)

Sokal Raion (Сокальський район)

Staryi Sambir Raion (Старосамбірський район)

Stryi Raion (Стрийський район)

Turka Raion (Турківський район)

Zhovkva Raion (Жовківський район)

Zhydachiv Raion (Жидачівський район)

Zolochiv Raion (Золочівський район)

Yavoriv Raion (Яворівський район ) 

Sytykhiv
Zavyshen

See also
 List of Canadian place names of Ukrainian origin

References 
  Львівська область 

Lviv